Pristiphora mollis  is a Holarctic species of  sawfly. It is typically found in the United Kingdom.

References

External links
The sawflies (Symphyta) of Britain and Ireland

Hymenoptera of Europe
Tenthredinidae
Insects described in 1837